Bobby Zahiruddin (January 1908 – 17 December 1989) was an Indian cricketer. He played first-class cricket for Hyderabad and United Provinces between 1931 and 1945.

See also
 List of Hyderabad cricketers

References

External links
 

1908 births
1989 deaths
Indian cricketers
Hyderabad cricketers
Uttar Pradesh cricketers
Cricketers from Jalandhar